Artlenburg is a municipality in the district of Lüneburg, in Lower Saxony, Germany. Artlenburg has an area of 11.85 km² and a population of 1,619 (as of December 31, 2007).

References